The Serbia women's national under-17 football team (Serbian Latin: Kadetska ženska reprezentacija Srbije) is the national under-17 football team of Serbia and is controlled by the Football Association of Serbia.

Current squad
The following players were named in the squad for the 2016 UEFA Women's U-17 Championship in May 2016.

|-
! colspan="9"  style="background:#b0d3fb; text-align:left;"|
|- style="background:#dfedfd;"

|-
! colspan="9"  style="background:#b0d3fb; text-align:left;"|
|- style="background:#dfedfd;"

|-
! colspan="9"  style="background:#b0d3fb; text-align:left;"|
|- style="background:#dfedfd;"

Competitive Record

FIFA World Youth Championship Record

UEFA European U-17 Championship Record

*Draws include knockout matches decided by penalty shootout.

See also
 Serbia women's national football team
 UEFA Women's U-17 Championship

External links
 Football Association of Serbia

Women's national under-17 association football teams
under
European women's national under-17 association football teams